Maysalun Hadi (born 1954) is an Iraqi writer. She was born in the Adhamiyah district of Baghdad and studied statistics at Baghdad University. As a writer, she has published numerous books and articles, spanning a wide range of genres. Her novel Prophecy of Pharaoh won the Bashraheel prize for best Arabic novel and was translated into English by Angham Altamimi. Another novel A Light Pink Dream was made into a film, while Throne and Stream has been translated into English and French. Her most recent work Mohammed's Brothers by Al-Thakera Publishing House was nominated for the Arabic Booker Prize. 

Hadi lives in Baghdad.

References

Iraqi writers
1954 births
Living people
Iraqi children's writers